Chip Carter is the name of:

James Earl "Chip" Carter III, son of former US president Jimmy Carter
Chip Carter, former sports director of WTVT